In nutrition, diet is the sum of food consumed by a person or other organism.
The word diet often implies the use of specific intake of nutrition for health or weight-management reasons (with the two often being related). Although humans are omnivores, each culture and each person holds some food preferences or some food taboos. This may be due to personal tastes or ethical reasons. Individual dietary choices may be more or less healthy.

Complete nutrition requires ingestion and absorption of vitamins, minerals, essential amino acids from protein and essential fatty acids from fat-containing food, also food energy in the form of carbohydrate, protein, and fat. Dietary habits and choices play a significant role in the quality of life, health and longevity.

Health 

A healthy diet can improve and maintain health, which can include aspects of mental and physical health. Specific diets, such as the DASH diet, can be used in treatment and management of chronic conditions.

Dietary recommendations exist for many different countries, and they usually emphasise a balanced diet which is culturally appropriate. These recommendation are different from dietary reference values which provide information about the prevention of nutrient deficiencies.

Dietary choices 

Exclusionary diets are diets with certain groups or specific types of food avoided, either due to health considerations or by choice. Many do not eat food from animal sources to varying degrees (e.g. flexitarianism, pescetarianism, vegetarianism, and veganism) for health reasons, issues surrounding morality, or to reduce their personal impact on the environment. People on a balanced vegetarian or vegan diet can obtain adequate nutrition, but may need to specifically focus on consuming specific nutrients, such as protein, iron, calcium, zinc, and vitamin B12. Raw foodism and intuitive eating are other approaches to dietary choices. Education, income, local availability, and mental health are all major factors for dietary choices.

Weight management 

A particular diet may be chosen to promote weight loss or weight gain. Changing a person's dietary intake, or "going on a diet", can change the energy balance, and increase or decrease the amount of fat stored by the body. The terms "healthy diet" and "diet for weight management" (dieting) are often related, as the two promote healthy weight management. If a person is overweight or obese, changing to a diet and lifestyle that allows them to burn more calories than they consume may improve their overall health, possibly preventing diseases that are attributed in part to weight, including heart disease and diabetes. Within the past 10 years, obesity rates have increased by almost 10%.Conversely, if a person is underweight due to illness or malnutrition, they may change their diet to promote weight gain. Intentional changes in weight, though often beneficial, can be potentially harmful to the body if they occur too rapidly. Unintentional rapid weight change can be caused by the body's reaction to some medications, or may be a sign of major medical problems including thyroid issues and cancer among other diseases.

Eating disorders 

An eating disorder is a mental disorder that interferes with normal food consumption. It is defined by abnormal eating habits, and thoughts about food that may involve eating much more or much less than needed. Common eating disorders include anorexia nervosa, bulimia nervosa, and binge-eating disorder. Eating disorders affect people of every gender, age, socioeconomic status, and body size.

Religious and cultural dietary choices 
Some cultures and religions have restrictions concerning what foods are acceptable in their diet. For example, only Kosher foods are permitted in Judaism, and Halal foods in Islam.  Although Buddhists are generally vegetarians, the practice varies and meat-eating may be permitted depending on the sects. In Hinduism, vegetarianism is the ideal. Jains are strictly vegetarian and in addition to that the consumption of any roots (ex: potatoes, carrots) is not permitted. 

In Christianity there is no restriction on kinds of animals that can be eaten, though various groups within Christianity have practiced specific dietary restrictions for various reasons. The most common diets used by Christians are Mediterranean and vegetarianism.

Diet classification table

Notes

See also 
 Diet food
 Dieting
 Dessert crop
 Intuitive eating
 Nutrition psychology

References

External links